The Bulgarian National Government-in-exile (Balgarsko natsionalno pravitelstvo v izgnanie) was a right-wing Bulgarian government-in-exile after the monarchist government of Bulgaria was deposed in a  communist backed coup d'état on September 9, 1944, and was replaced by the communist Fatherland Front, which later formed the People's Republic of Bulgaria. The Bulgarian government in exile had very little support among Bulgarians and  commanded Bulgarian troops loyal to the Germans. It was dissolved in May 1945, and its prime minister, the Bulgarian nationalist Aleksandar Tsankov, fled to Argentina.

History

On September 16, 1944, the right-wing leader Aleksandar Tsankov made a radio announcement stating that: "The fight for the liberation of Bulgaria from the Jewish-Bolshevik yoke is in secure hands. The Bulgarian National government calls on fight against the oppressors of our motherland". However, the Bulgarian government-in-exile under Tsankov had no international recognition. On 13 November 1944, the government worked with the Waffen-SS to create a Bulgarian volunteer unit. This formation was known as the Bulgarian Grenadier Regiment and was planned to be expanded to a division. In February 1945 the Bulgarian Government moved from Vienna to Altaussee and soon after dissolved, in May. After the Second World War Tsankov fled to Argentina and died in Belgrano, Buenos Aires, in 1959.

Government and politics

Ministers
Members of the government:
Aleksandar Tsankov, Prime Minister
Assen Kantardzhiev, Minister of the Interior
Assen Tsankov, Minister of Foreign Affairs
Hristo Statev, Minister of Education and Propaganda
, Minister of Finance and Labor
Nikola Kostov, minister without portfolio

See also
 Kingdom of Bulgaria
 Bulgarian coup d'état of 1944

References

Sources

Government of Bulgaria
Bulgaria in World War II
Governments in exile during World War II
Anti-communism in Bulgaria
Bulgaria–Soviet Union relations